Bolitoglossa engelhardti is a species of salamander in the family Plethodontidae. It is found in the extreme south-eastern Chiapas, Mexico, and eastward along the Pacific versant to Volcán Atitlán in south-western Guatemala. It is named for Teodoro Engelhardt, Guatemalan plantation owner who entertained Karl Patterson Schmidt and his expedition. Its common names include Engelhardt's salamander, Engelhardt's mushroomtongue salamander, and Engelhardt's climbing salamander.

Description
The head is large and the eyes are big and protruding. The body has 13 costal grooves. The limbs are well developed; the digits are webbed. The tail is constricted at the base. Coloration is dark grey above, becoming lighter on the flanks. The ventral side is yellow. Some individuals have a banded color pattern, with sharply defined light dorsal area or pair of dorsolateral bands.

A leucistic Bolitoglossa engelhardti has been observed on Volcán Chicabal, representing probably the first leucistic Bolitoglossa on record.

Habitat and conservation
It is an arboreal species often found in bromeliads, rarely on the ground. Breeding is direct (without free-living larvae) and not dependent on water.

This species was formerly common, but appears to have declined and is now uncommon or rare. It is threatened by habitat loss caused by agricultural activities, logging, and human settlements. It is present in the "Quetzal Reserve" in Chiapas and in the proposed protected area of Volcán Atitlán.

References

engelhardti
Amphibians of Guatemala
Amphibians of Mexico
Taxa named by Karl Patterson Schmidt
Amphibians described in 1936
Taxonomy articles created by Polbot